Hillcrest High School is a public four year high school located in Country Club Hills, Illinois. It is part of Bremen High School District 228 which also includes Tinley Park High School, Oak Forest High School, and Bremen High School. The name "Hillcrest" aside from the obvious connotation of being "the highest point of a hill", is a portmanteau of the two towns which the school primarily serves: Country Club Hills and Hazel Crest.

History
The first principal of Hillcrest, William Henry Reeves, was appointed in May 1965, leaving his job as principal of Bremen High School to start the new school.  Groundbreaking took place in November of that year, with a needed bond referendum passing in December 1966 to cover construction of an addition, even before the school was opened.  The school opened in February 1967.<ref>[https://search.proquest.com/docview/175820962 Bremen District Hires 11 Teachers, 7 July 1968, Chicago Tribune, p. S2;  accessed 31 August 2008]</ref>

The early 1970s at Hillcrest saw a number of racially motivated incidents as the demographics of the school's attendance area began to shift.  A late April 1970 incident, coupled with similar incidents in other local schools led to the spread of attacks beyond the school to the local community of Markham.Markham hit by 2nd night of race turmoil, 1 May 1970, Chicago Tribune p. 18;  accessed 31 August 2008  In 1971, the school was temporarily closed after a racially motivated fight that resulted in 48 students being suspended.  1973 saw a 14 May riot that resulted in 34 suspensions and the recommendation for 20 expulsions.  When the school board, under pressure from parents, decided to rescind some of the punishments without consulting the building staff or administration, the school's principal, Lee Cox, requested reassignment.Hillcrest unrest leaves question, 21 June 1973, Chicago Tribunelie, p. W_A6;  accessed 31 August 2008

In 1990, the FBI investigated an incident involving several students from the school who claimed they had been harassed by a Forest Preserve officer while taking a day off from school illegally.  Among those counseling parents at the time was R. Eugene Pincham.Koziol, Ronald, Students found innocent in 'ditch day' disturbance, 26 July 1990, Chicago Tribune, p. 4;  accessed 31 August 2008

In February 1994, the school cancelled planned parent-teacher conferences and a day off of school to accommodate a visit by President Bill Clinton.  Students were banned from parking at the school that day to accommodate the president's helicopter, Marine One, landing in the parking lot.  The visit coincided with the Brady Bill becoming law.Elsner, David, Anti-crime theme echoes at Hillcrest, 1 March 1994, Chicago Tribune, p. 1.

Student life

Activities
Hillcrest sponsors over 35 extracurricular activities ranging from academic competition and performing arts to cultural and special interests.  Activities which are chapters or affiliates of nationally notable organizations include Business Professionals of America, DECA, FCCLA, Key club, and National Honor Society. In the performing arts, the school supports a band, chorus, and drama club.

Athletics
Hillcrest competes in the South Suburban Conference (SSC) and is a member of the Illinois High School Association (IHSA), which governs most sports and competitive activities in the state. Teams are stylized as the Hawks. 

The school sponsors interscholastic sports teams for both men and women in basketball, bowling, cross country, and track & field.  Men may also compete in baseball, football, golf, and wrestling while women may compete in cheerleading, softball, tennis, and volleyball. 

The new Athletic Director is Maurice Young.

The following teams won or placed top 4 in their respective IHSA sponsored state championship tournament/meet: 

 Basketball (Boys): State Champions (2009-10); 3rd Place (2011-12)
 Basketball (Girls): 2nd Place (2009-10, 2010-11); 3rd Place (2012-13)
 Bowling (Girls): 3rd Place (1989-90)
 Track (Boys): State Champions (2008-09, 2009-10)

Notable alumni

 Maurice Acker is a former college basketball player for the Marquette Golden Eagles.
 Maurice "Mobetta" Brown (born 1981) is a Grammy Award-Winning jazz trumpeter, producer and composer. As a member of Tedeschi Trucks Band, he shared the 2011 Grammy for Best Blues Album (Revelator'')
 Danny Clark is an NFL linebacker, formerly playing for the New York Giants.
 Marquice Cole is an NFL cornerback, formerly playing for the New York Jets.
 Herb Coleman is a former American football player
 Gary Dotson (did not graduate) was a convicted rapist whose conviction was overturned after his accuser recanted.  He is believed to be the first person exonerated of a crime through DNA evidence.
 Brady Dougan is the CEO of Credit Suisse.
 Jerel McNeal is a former basketball player for the Marquette Golden Eagles, now in the Israeli Basketball Premier League.
 Corey McPherrin is an Emmy Award winning television sports reporter, currently working as the weekday reporter and Sports Director for WFLD-TV, the Fox television affiliate in Chicago.

References 

Public high schools in Cook County, Illinois